The Euroradar Captor is a next-generation mechanical multi-mode pulse Doppler radar designed for the Eurofighter Typhoon. Development of Captor led to the Airborne Multirole Solid State Active Array Radar (AMSAR) project which eventually produced the CAESAR (Captor Active Electronically Scanned Array Radar), now known as Captor-E.

Development
Development started as the ECR-90 at Ferranti's Edinburgh radar labs, home of many British radar systems. The ECR-90 was based on the Blue Vixen radar which had been developed for the BAE Sea Harrier FA2. The selection of the radar had become a major stumbling block in the EFA project, as the Eurofighter Typhoon was known at the time. Britain, Italy and Spain supported the Ferranti-led ECR-90, while West Germany preferred the MSD2000, based on the US AN/APG-65 radar family being developed in a collaboration between Hughes, AEG and GEC.

An agreement was reached after the British Defence Secretary Tom King assured his West German counterpart Gerhard Stoltenberg that the British government would underwrite the project and allow GEC to acquire Ferranti Defence Systems from its troubled parent. Ferranti's labs became the new GEC Ferranti in 1990, and then BAE Systems Avionics when GEC's various military electronics divisions - Ferranti, Marconi and Elliott Brothers - were merged.

Hughes sued GEC for $600 million for its role in the selection of the EFA and alleged that it used Hughes technology in the ECR-90 when it took over Ferranti. It later dropped this allegation and was awarded $23 million; the court judged that the MSD-2000 "had a real or substantial chance of succeeding had GEC not [tortiously] intervened... and had the companies, which were bound by the Collaboration Agreement, faithfully and diligently performed their continuing obligations thereunder to press and promote the case for MSD-2000."

Since these events, further mergers have taken place in the industry. Parts of BAE Systems Avionics were merged with Galileo Avionica to form SELEX Galileo in 2005 which in turn then merged with other Finmeccanica defence electronics companies in 2013 to create Selex ES (merged in turn in Finmeccanica, rebranded Leonardo since 2017). The development effort is now organized under the Euroradar consortium, consisting primarily of Selex ES, as well as Airbus and Indra.

The ECR-90 was renamed CAPTOR when the project passed the production contract milestone.

Captor-E AESA variant 

In 1993 a European research project was launched to create the Airborne Multirole Solid State Active Array Radar (AMSAR); it was run by the British-French-German GTDAR ("GEC-Thomson-DASA Airborne Radar") consortium (now Selex ES, Thales and Airbus respectively). This evolved into the CAESAR (Captor Active Electronically Scanned Array Radar), now known as Captor-E Active electronically scanned array.

In May 2007, Eurofighter Development Aircraft 5 made the first flight with the a prototype of the Captor-E. The Captor-E is based on the Captor radar currently in service on Eurofighter production aircraft. The new generation of radar is intended to replace the mechanically steered antennas and high-power transmitters used on current Eurofighter aircraft with an electronically steered array This enables new mission capabilities for combat aircraft such as simultaneous radar functionalities, air surveillance, air-to-ground and weapon control. The new radar improves the effective air-to-air missile range of the aircraft and allows for faster and more accurate detection and tracking of multiple aircraft with lower life cycle costs. In July 2010, it was reported that the Euroradar consortium made a formal offer to provide an AESA solution for the Eurofighter. The consortium plans to retain as much "back-end" equipment as possible while developing the new radar and also stated that the inclusion of an AESA radar was an important in securing orders from foreign nations.

On 19 November 2014, at the Edinburgh office of Selex ES, the European consortium Eurofighter GmbH and the inter-governmental agency NETMA (NATO Eurofighter and Tornado Management Agency) signed a contract worth €1 billion to develop the electronically scanned digital antenna array Captor-E radar for the Typhoon.

See also
 AI.24 Foxhunter

References

External links
 Captor-E Radar on https://electronics.leonardo.com/it/radars-sensors

Aircraft radars
Ferranti
Military radars